Nataliya Olegovna Goncharova (born 1 June 1989), from 2012 to 2016 Obmochaeva, is a Russian volleyball player. She played for the Ukraine women's national volleyball team until 2010 when she became part of the Russia women's national volleyball team.

Career
She played with the Ukrainian team at the 2005 Girls' Youth European Volleyball Championship, the 2006 Women's Junior European Volleyball Championship, the 2007 Junior World Championship, the qualification for the Women's European Volleyball Championship (in 2007 and 2009), and the qualification for the 2008 Summer Olympics

With Russia, she was part of the teams which played the 2013 Summer Universiade in Kazan, the FIVB Volleyball World Grand Prix (in 2011, 2013, 2014, 2015, 2016), the European Championships (in 2011, 2013, 2015), the FIVB Volleyball Women's World Championship (in 2010, 2014, 2018), the 2015 FIVB Volleyball Women's World Cup in Japan, and the Olympic Games of London 2012, Rio 2016. and Tokyo 2020.

At club level, she played for University (in Ivano-Frankivsk) and Regina (in Rivne) before moving to Dynamo Moscow in 2007. Goncharova has been chosen the best player of the Russian Super League three times  (in 2014–15, 2015–16 and 2016–17).

Personal life
In 2012, she married Russian volleyball player Aleksey Obmochaev. However, they divorced in January 2016.

Awards

Individuals
 2013 Summer Universiade "Most Valuable Player"
 2013 Summer Universiade "Best Spiker"
 2015 FIVB Grand Prix "Best Opposite"
 2015 FIVB World Cup "Best Opposite"
 2016 Women's European qualification "MVP"
 2019 FIVB World Cup "Best Scorer"
 2020 Russian Championship "Best scorer"
 2014-15 Russian Championship "Best player"
 2015-16 Russian Championship "Best player" 
 2016-17 Russian Championship "Best player"
 2017-18 Russian Championship "Best player"
 2018-19 Russian Championship "Best player"

National team

Junior
 2005 Girls' Youth European Volleyball Championship –  Gold medal (with Ukraine)
 2006 Women's Junior European Volleyball Championship –  Bronze medal (with Ukraine)
 2013 Universiade –  Gold medal (with Russia)

Senior
 2010 FIVB World Championship –  Gold medal (with Russia)
 2013 European Championship –  Gold medal (with Russia)
 2014 FIVB World Grand Prix –  Bronze medal (with Russia)
 2015 FIVB World Grand Prix –  Silver medal (with Russia)
 2015 European Championship –  Gold medal (with Russia)
 2019 World Cup -  Bronze medal (with Russia)

Clubs
 2007 Russian Cup –  Silver medal (with Dinamo Moscow)
 2007–08 Russian Championship –  Silver medal (with Dinamo Moscow)
 2008 Russian Cup –  Silver medal (with Dinamo Moscow)
 2008–09 Russian Championship –  Gold medal (with Dinamo Moscow)
 2008–09 CEV Women's Champions League –  Silver medal (with Dinamo Moscow)
 2009 Russian Cup –  Gold medal (with Dinamo Moscow)
 2009–10 Russian Championship –  Silver medal (with Dinamo Moscow)
 2010–11 Russian Championship –  Silver medal (with Dinamo Moscow)
 2011 Russian Cup –  Gold medal (with Dinamo Moscow)
 2011–12 Russian Championship –  Silver medal (with Dinamo Moscow)
 2012 Russian Cup –  Silver medal (with Dinamo Moscow)
 2012–13 Russian Championship –  Silver medal (with Dinamo Moscow)
 2013 Russian Cup –  Gold medal (with Dinamo Moscow)
 2013–14 Russian Championship –  Silver medal (with Dinamo Moscow)
 2014–15 Russian Championship –  Silver medal (with Dinamo Moscow)
 2015–16 Russian Championship –  Gold medal (with Dinamo Moscow)
 2016 Russian Cup –  Silver medal (with Dinamo Moscow)
 2016–17 Russian Championship –  Gold medal (with Dinamo Moscow)

References

External links
Profile at CEV
Profile  at Women's Volleyball Club Dinamo (Moscow)

1989 births
Living people
Ukrainian women's volleyball players
Russian women's volleyball players
Olympic volleyball players of Russia
Volleyball players at the 2012 Summer Olympics
Volleyball players at the 2016 Summer Olympics
Universiade medalists in volleyball
Universiade gold medalists for Russia
Volleyball players at the 2020 Summer Olympics
Sportspeople from Lviv Oblast